FLEX Records is a Danish record label. Label founded by Scandinavian Records in 1994 to release various electronic music (mainly - dance genres). It was sold to the Danish branch of the EMI group in 1996.

FX Records is a sublabel of FLEX Records which positions itself in ambient music.

Past and present musicians 
FLEX Records has signed many popular artists from multiple genres, including

 Aligator, DJ
 Baby D
 Baruch
 B.B.E.
 Cartoons
 Celvin Rotane
 Dado, DJ
 De Bos
 Dub Tractor
 Groovezone
 Heller 'N Farley Project
 Hypetraxx
 iiO
 Infernal
 Josh Wink
 Laid Back
 Little Jam
 Los Umbrellos
 Mo-Do
 Norman Bass
 Outhere Brothers, The
 Paul Johnson
 Ruffneck Featuring Yavahn
 Simpson Tune
 Sunzet Sunzation!
 Threesome Allstars, The
 Tiggy
 Tom Wilson
 Vincent De Moor
 Whigfield

See also 
 List of record labels

External links
 FLEX Records (DK) at Discogs

Danish record labels
Record labels established in 1994
IFPI members